The women's singles was one of five events of the 1914 World Hard Court Championships tennis tournament held in Paris, France from 29 May until 8 June 1914. The draw consisted of 19 players. Mieken Rieck was the defending champion, but did not participate. Suzanne Lenglen won her first of four titles, defeating fellow French player Germaine Golding in the final.

Draw

Finals

Top half

Bottom half

References 

Women's Singles
World Hard Court Championships